Kaari may refer to:

Catfish, also known as Kaari, diverse group of ray-finned fish
Kaari Utrio (born 1942), proper surname Utrio-Linnilä, Finnish writer
Malaiyamaan Kaari, one of the kings of the Tamil royal house clan Velir of the Malaiyamān dynasty

See also

Rosaappo Ravikkai Kaari, 1979 Tamil language film
Karri (disambiguation)